Scott Mayman   is an Australian radio presenter.  Born in Australia, he has worked professionally in both his home country, and in the United States, where he has won a number of awards, including "Best Radio News Story" at the Gold Coast Media Awards in 2009. Scott also won the "Best Presenter Award" two years in a row. 

Since 2010, Scott has operated the 4BC/101FM "ready reserve" program. 

Scott is the former News Director at Radio 4BC Brisbane (from 2010 to 2015)  and former  breakfast show host (Morning Drive as they say in America) at FM104.1 Gold Coast and is currently an opinion panelist with SKY NEWS and remains the Australian Correspondent for CBS Radio News.

References

External links
 https://thesourcenews.com/2015/09/12/we-remember-911-14-years-on/
 https://www.dailytelegraph.com.au/news/nsw/tweed-heads/nightmare-holiday-for-tweed-journo/news-story/1f7ba81044bdbff809622a8df477562a
 https://www.radioinfo.com.au/news/opposing-broadcasters-unite-say-goodbye-friend
 https://www.radiotoday.com.au/10-questions-with-scott-mayman/
 https://www.radioinfo.com.au/news/celebrating-30-years-broadcasting
 https://www.radioinfo.com.au/news/who-killed-local-radio
 https://www.radioinfo.com.au/news/blankety-blanks-revived-radio-97
 https://radioinfo.com.au/news/scott-mayman-returning-australia
 https://www.radioinfo.com.au/news/inexperience-newsroom-leads-aborted-trials
 https://www.radioinfo.com.au/news/scott-mayman-wins-surprise-media-award

Living people
Year of birth missing (living people)